Raimo Heino (September 13, 1932 – November 30, 1995) was a Finnish designer of coins, relief figures and medallions.

He was the designer of the Finnish 2 euro coin. All designs feature the 12 stars of the EU and the year of imprint on the front side and a national design on the other; Heino's work shows cloudberry, the golden berry of northern Finland. He was also the designer of the Nevanlinna Prize medal. He made sculpture of steel and stone.

Sources
Kuvataiteilijamatrikkeli.fi

Finnish designers
1932 births
1995 deaths